Albert "Tober" Mark Weston was an English professional footballer. He appeared in the English Football League for Swindon Town and in 2002 was named as the club's 95th all-time great.

References

1888 births
People from Havant
English footballers
Association football defenders
Calne Town F.C. players
Swindon Town F.C. players
English Football League players
Year of death missing